Carnelian (born 1974) is a Japanese CG and dōjinshi artist. She had done artwork and character designs for various anime, products, visual novels, and regular novels. Some of her best-known visual novel games include Moonlight Lady, Yami to Bōshi to Hon no Tabibito, Day of Love, and Quilt. She established her own game company named Root, and occasionally draws dōjinshi.

Works

Video games

Anime

Products

Books

References

External links
  

Manga artists
Living people
Hentai creators
1974 births